The Clutha River (officially gazetted as Clutha River / ) is the second longest river in New Zealand and the longest in the South Island. The river is known for its scenery, gold-rush history, and swift turquoise waters. A river conservation group, the Clutha Mata-Au River Parkway Group, is working to establish a regional river parkway, with a trail, along the entire river corridor.

Geography
 
The ultimate source of the river is at the head of the Makarora River, close to the saddle of the Haast Pass, which flows into the northern end of Lake Wānaka. The southern end of the lake drains into the nascent Clutha close to Albert Town, where it is met by its first main tributary, the Hāwea River, the outflow of Lake Wānaka's twin, Lake Hāwea. Close downstream it is fed by the Cardrona River.

The river flows swiftly through the Upper Clutha Valley between ancient glacial terraces, negotiating a long section called the 'Snake'. Near Luggate is a rare switchback feature called the "Devil's Nook". The river narrows as it passes through the Māori Gorge at Queensberry. Below another tributary, the Lindis, the river widens again as it enters Lake Dunstan, created by the massive hydroelectric dam at Clyde.

Fifty kilometres south of Lake Wānaka, the Clutha reaches the town of Cromwell at the junction with the Kawarau River. The area was substantially altered when the Clyde Dam project was commissioned in 1992. Before the Clyde Dam, this river junction was known as the Cromwell Junction, renowned for the difference in colour between the two rivers’ waters.

Below the Kawarau junction, the river flows southeast through the inundated Cromwell Gorge to Clyde and nearby Alexandra, where it is joined by the waters of the Manuherikia River. South of Alexandra the river widens again to form Lake Roxburgh, another artificial lake, behind the Roxburgh Dam. In 1956, the hydroelectric reservoir flooded the Roxburgh Gorge and several large rapids including the Molyneux Falls and the Golden Falls.

From Roxburgh the river continues southeast past the towns of Ettrick, Millers Flat, and Beaumont, before flowing through the Rongahere Gorge, admired for its native bush corridor and for the Birch Island native tree reserve. Beyond here, the river is met by the Tuapeka River at Tuapeka Mouth. At this point the river turns southward, before being met by its last major tributary, the Pomahaka River, which joins the Clutha  from the coast. The river passes the town of Balclutha before widening into the Clutha delta which contains the large flat island of Inch Clutha. Here the river divides into two distributary branches. The Matau (northern) branch flows past Kaitangata. The southern branch is called the Koau. Both branches flow into the Pacific Ocean at Molyneux Bay.

River flow

This heavy flow, combined with the relatively small size of the river in global terms, makes the Clutha notoriously fast-flowing. It is often listed as one of the world's most swiftly flowing rivers, alongside Australia's Macleay and Fitzroy Rivers, the Amazon and Atrato Rivers in South America, and the Teesta River in the Himalayas.

The waters of the Upper Clutha are clear turquoise, the result of glacial and snow-melt filtering when the water flows through Lake Wānaka. This is a rare characteristic for a high volume river. Below Cromwell, where the silt-laden Kawarau enters, the waters are less turquoise.

Beyond the river's mouth
Such is the nature of the geology of the New Zealand region that the true river tells only half the story of the course of the Clutha. Beyond its mouth, a submarine canyon system extends for over  into the South Pacific Ocean, eventually becoming the Bounty Trough. The canyon system bears a remarkable resemblance to the pattern of river and tributaries visible on land, so much so that many of the rivers which empty into the sea along the Otago coast can virtually be considered tributaries of the Clutha's submarine system. These rivers include the Tokomairaro, Taieri, Waikouaiti, Waihemo / Shag, and even the Waitaki.

The quartz and schist geology of much of the Clutha River catchment leads to the river transporting white quartz material downstream and depositing this on coastal beaches. The general northerly current in the Pacific Ocean leads to this sand being transported and eventually deposited on beaches north to the Otago Peninsula and beyond. The Roxburgh Hydro Scheme has blocked the supply of new sand from the river, causing erosion of beaches further north such as St. Kilda Beach and St. Clair Beach, Dunedin, and along the Coastal Road at Kakanui.

History

Names
The river is known in Māori as Mata-au, meaning current or eddy in an expanse of water.

The official name has been Clutha River / Mata-au since the Ngāi Tahu Claims Settlement Act 1998, a landmark Treaty of Waitangi settlement which added dual names to approximately 90 geographic features throughout the South Island to recognise the "equal and special significance" of both the English and Māori names for the river.

The spelling of the Māori part of the name is likely to be updated to Matau, while the river takes the English component of its name from Cluaidh, the Scots Gaelic name for the River Clyde in Scotland which runs through Glasgow. During New Zealand's early colonial history it was officially known as the Molyneux from below the junction with the Kawarau River at Cromwell, that name given to it by Captain Cook.

Natural history
The upper reaches of the river once abounded in flightless moa, predated upon by the Haast's eagle.

Māori history
The river was an important route for Māori, providing direct access from the coast through Central Otago into lakes Wānaka, Hāwea and Whakatipu Waimāori.

The mouth of Mata-au was heavily populated, with many permanent and temporary Ngāi Tahu  (settlements) throughout the lower stretches of the river. Murikauhaka, a kāika near the mouth of the Mata-au, was at one stage home to an estimated two hundred people.

European settlement
During early European settlement, a whaling station was established close to the river's mouth at Port Molyneux, and during this period the sea was the source of almost all of the area's economy.

Gold rush
The river featured greatly in the Central Otago goldrush. The first major gold deposits in Otago were discovered around the Tuapeka River at Gabriel's Gully by Gabriel Read in 1861, and the following year large amounts of the precious metal were discovered close to the site of modern Cromwell.

By Christmas 1861, 14,000 prospectors were on the Tuapeka and Waipori fields. The gold rush was short-lived, with most of the alluvial gold played out by 1863, but prospectors continued to arrive, swelling to a maximum of 18,000 miners in February 1864.

Floods
 Several major floods have occurred on the Clutha, most notably the “Hundred year floods” of 14–16 October 1878 and 13–15 October 1978. The 1878 flood is regarded as New Zealand's greatest known flood. During this, a bridge at Clydevale was washed downstream, where it collided with the Balclutha Road Bridge, destroying the latter. The course of the river near its mouth was greatly affected, with the mouth moving north from its former outlet to create two new outlets at its current mouth. The thriving town of Port Molyneux, which was located at the river's (former) mouth, dwindled as a result and today no longer exists.

The 1978 flood breached the banks of rivers from the Ōreti in the south to the Tokomairaro. Over  of land was inundated, with the loss of over 21,000 livestock. Towns and areas affected stretched from Makarora in the north to Invercargill in the south. The town of Wyndham was completely evacuated, and the towns of Balclutha, Milton and Mataura were seriously affected with many residents moved. The small settlement of Kelso on the banks of the Pomahaka River was completely abandoned and was not rebuilt once the waters subsided.

A major flood in 1999 seriously damaged river communities, especially Alexandra. The flooding in Alexandra was attributed to a rise in the riverbed, resulting from silt loading in the Roxburgh reservoir behind the Roxburgh Dam downriver from the town. The 1999 flood had significantly higher water levels in Alexandra than the 1878 flood, despite being only 80% of the volume of the latter.

Water usage 

Two hydroelectric power stations, the 464MW Clyde Dam and the 320MW Roxburgh Dam, provide electricity to the New Zealand power grid. Other dam projects proposed for the river have been cancelled.

Several Local Authorities along the Clutha River use it as a source for treatment plants to provide communities with potable water.

The Clutha provides irrigation for stone fruit orchards and vineyards around Cromwell, Alexandra, and Roxburgh, which grow apples, apricots, nectarines, cherries, peaches and grapes.  There are more vineyards in the upper reaches of the river at Bannockburn, Bendigo, Tarras and Wānaka.

The spectacular scenery of Central Otago makes the upper Clutha a popular holiday destination, especially for adventure tourism. People enjoy jetboating, kayaking, rafting, riverboarding, and guided fishing on the river, and there are commercial waterskiing, tandem parachuting and parapenting operators.   It is also used for multi-sports events; Lake Dunstan is an important rowing venue. Major ski fields are in the mountains at the head of the catchment. Curling is played close to the river in the harsh Central Otago winters.

See also
Rivers of New Zealand

References

Further reading

External links
 Cromwell and Districts Promotion Group

 
Rivers of Otago
Otago Gold Rush
Rivers of New Zealand